General elections were held in East Germany on 14 June 1981. 500 deputies were elected to the Volkskammer, with all of them being candidates of the single-list National Front. 679 Front candidates were put forward, with 500 being elected and 179 becoming substitute deputies. At its first session on 25 June, the Volkskammer re-elected Willi Stoph as Chairman of the Council of Ministers, while Erich Honecker, General Secretary of the ruling Socialist Unity Party, was also re-elected Chairman of the Council of State.

Results

References
Inter-Parliamentary Union: HISTORICAL ARCHIVE OF PARLIAMENTARY ELECTION RESULTS - Germany
Richard Felix Staar. Communist Regimes in Eastern Europe. Fourth Edition. California: Hoover Institution Press. 1982. p. 109.

1981 in East Germany
Elections in East Germany
1981 elections in Germany
June 1981 events in Europe
East Germany